UFC Fight Night: Nelson vs. Ponzinibbio (also known as UFC Fight Night 113) was a mixed martial arts event produced by the Ultimate Fighting Championship held on July 16, 2017 at The SSE Hydro in Glasgow, Scotland.

Background
The event was the second that the promotion has hosted in Glasgow, following UFC Fight Night: Bisping vs. Leites in July 2015.

A welterweight bout between Gunnar Nelson and Santiago Ponzinibbio headlined the event.

Mark Godbeer was expected to face promotional newcomer Justin Willis at the event. However, Godbeer pulled out of the fight on May 21 citing injury and was replaced by fellow newcomer James Mulheron.

Lina Länsberg was expected to face Leslie Smith at the event, but she pulled out on June 21 due to undisclosed reasons and was replaced by promotional newcomer Amanda Lemos.

Mitch Gagnon was expected to face Brett Johns at the event. However, Gagnon was removed from the card on June 27 and replaced by Albert Morales.

At the weigh-ins, Joanne Calderwood came in at 118 lb, two pounds over the strawweight limit of 116 lb. As a result, she was fined 20% of her purse, which went to Cynthia Calvillo and their bout proceeded as scheduled at a catchweight.

Results

Bonus awards
The following fighters were awarded $50,000 bonuses:
Fight of the Night: Danny Henry vs. Daniel Teymur
Performance of the Night: Santiago Ponzinibbio and Paul Felder

See also
List of UFC events
2017 in UFC

References

UFC Fight Night
Mixed martial arts in the United Kingdom
International sports competitions in Glasgow
2017 in mixed martial arts
2017 in Scottish sport
July 2017 sports events in the United Kingdom
2010s in Glasgow